McCorvey is a surname. Notable people with the surname include:

Everett McCorvey, American classical tenor, teacher, impresario, conductor, and producer
Kez McCorvey (born 1972), American football player
Norma McCorvey (1947–2017), American activist
Woody McCorvey, American football coach and administrator